Serui-Laut, or Arui, is an Austronesian language spoken on Serui Island of the Ambai Islands, in Western New Guinea, Indonesia.

Serui Island is located in Cenderawasih Bay of Papua Province.

It is one of the Yapen languages, in the South Halmahera–West New Guinea languages group.

References

South Halmahera–West New Guinea languages
Languages of western New Guinea
Ambai Islands
Papua (province) culture